Jesús Vázquez may refer to:

 Jesús Vázquez (television presenter) (born 1965), Spanish television presenter
 Jesús Vázquez (cyclist) (born 1969), Mexican cyclist
 Jesús Vázquez (footballer, born 1980), Spanish former footballer
 Jesús Vázquez (footballer, born 1994), Mexican soccer player
 Jesús Vázquez (footballer, born 1995), American soccer player
 Jesús Vázquez (footballer, born 2003), Spanish footballer

See also
 Jesús Vásquez (1920–2010), Peruvian singer